Agapanthia is a genus of flat-faced longhorn beetle belonging to the family Cerambycidae, subfamily Lamiinae.

List of species
The genus Agapanthia includes the following nine subgenera:

 Subgenus Agapanthia Audinet-Serville, 1835
 Agapanthia boeberi (Fischer von Walheim, 1806) - endemic to Lebanon.
 Agapanthia cardui (Linnaeus, 1767) - Europe, Near East and East Palearctic realm.
 Agapanthia hirsuticornis Holzschuh, 1975 - endemic to Iran.
 Agapanthia obydovi Danilevsky, 2000 - endemic to Kazakhstan.
 Agapanthia suturalis (Fabricius, 1787)inq. Sicily, Spain, the Near East, North Africa, and Turkey.
 Agapanthia talassica Kostin, 1973 - endemic to Kazakhstan.
 Subgenus Agapanthoplia Pesarini & Sabbadini, 2004
 Agapanthia coeruleipennis Frivaldszky, 1878 - Turkey, Iran, and Syria.
 Subgenus Amurobia Pesarini & Sabbadini, 2004
 Agapanthia amurensis Kraatz, 1879 - Mongolia, North Korea, and Russia.
 Agapanthia japonica Kano, 1933 - Japan.
 Agapanthia pilicornis Fabricius, 1787 - Trans-Baikal, Sakhalin, northern Mongolia, northern China, Korean peninsula, and Japan.
 Agapanthia yagii Hayashi, 1982 - Japan
 Subgenus Drosotrichia Pesarini & Sabbadini, 2004
 Agapanthia annularis (Olivier, 1795)
 Subgenus Epoptes Gistl, 1857
 Agapanthia alaiensis Kratochvíl, 1985
 Agapanthia alexandris Pic, 1901
 Agapanthia altaica Plavilstshikov, 1933
 Agapanthia alternans Fischer von Waldheim, 1842
 Agapanthia angelicae Reitter, 1898
 Agapanthia asphodeli (Latreille, 1804)
 Agapanthia auliensis Pic, 1907
 Agapanthia cretica Bernhauer, 1978
 Agapanthia cynarae (Germar, 1817)
 Agapanthia dahli (Richter, 1821)
 Agapanthia daurica Ganglbauer, 1883
 Agapanthia detrita Kraatz, 1882
 Agapanthia kindermanni Pic, 1905
 Agapanthia lateralis Ganglbauer, 1883
 Agapanthia lederi Ganglbauer, 1883
 Agapanthia muellneri Reitter, 1898
 Agapanthia nicosiensis Pic, 1927
 Agapanthia nitidipennis Holzschuh, 1984
 Agapanthia persica Semenov, 1893
 Agapanthia probsti Holzschuh, 1984
 Agapanthia pustulifera Pic, 1905
 Agapanthia salviae Holzschuh, 1975
 Agapanthia schmidti Holzschuh, 1975
 Agapanthia schurmanni Sama, 1979
 Agapanthia simplicicornis Reitter, 1898
 Agapanthia subchalybaea Reitter, 1898
 Agapanthia subflavida Pic, 1903
 Agapanthia subnigra Pic, 1890
 Agapanthia talassica Kostin, 1973
 Agapanthia transcaspica Pic, 1900
 Agapanthia turanica Plavilstshikov, 1929
 Agapanthia verecunda Chevrolat, 1882
 Agapanthia villosoviridescens (DeGeer, 1775) - Golden-bloomed Grey Longhorn 
 Agapanthia walteri Reitter, 1898
 Agapanthia zappii Sama, 1987
 Subgenus Homoblephara Pesarini & Sabbadini, 2004
 Agapanthia fallax Holzschuh, 1973
 Agapanthia korostelevi Danilevsky, 1985
 Agapanthia maculicornis (Gyllenhal, 1817)
 Agapanthia orbachi Sama, 1993
 Subgenus Smaragdula Pesarini & Sabbadini, 2004
 Agapanthia amitina Holzschuh, 1989
 Agapanthia chalybaea Faldermann, 1837
 Agapanthia frivaldszkyi Ganglbauer, 1883
 Agapanthia gemella Holzschuh, 1989
 Agapanthia incerta Plavilstshikov, 1930
 Agapanthia intermedia Ganglbauer, 1883
 Agapanthia lais Reiche, 1858
 Agapanthia osmanlis Reiche & Saulcy, 1858
 Agapanthia persicola Reitter, 1894
 Agapanthia pesarinii Rapuzzi & Sama, 2010
 Agapanthia violacea (Fabricius, 1775)
 Subgenus Stichodera Pesarini & Sabbadini, 2004
 Agapanthia irrorata (Fabricius, 1787)
 Agapanthia nigriventris Waterhouse, 1889
 Agapanthia soror Kraatz, 1882
 Subgenus Synthapsia Pesarini & Sabbadini, 2004
 Agapanthia kirbyi (Gyllenhal, 1817)

References

 Biolib
 Global Species 

 
Agapanthiini
Beetles of Europe